Palanca may refer to:

People
Bernard Palanca (born 1976), Filipino actor
Massimo Palanca (born 1953), Italian footballer
Mico Palanca (1978–2019), Filipino actor
Miguel Palanca (born 1987), Spanish footballer

Places
 Palanca, Huíla, Angola
 Palanca, Luanda, Quilamba Quiaxi municipality, Angola
 Palanca, Drochia, Moldova
 Palanca, Ștefan Vodă, Moldova
 Palanca, Hîrjauca, Moldova
 Palanca, Bacău, Romania
 Palanca, Florești-Stoenești, Romania
 Palanca, Râfov, Romania
 Palanca River, a tributary of Râmnicel, Romania

Other uses
Palanca Awards, literary awards of the Philippines
Palanca TV, an Angolan TV station

See also

Palanka (disambiguation)